Distal hereditary motor neuronopathies (distal HMN, dHMN), sometimes also called distal hereditary motor neuropathies, are a genetically and clinically heterogeneous group of motor neuron diseases that result from genetic mutations in various genes and are characterized by degeneration and loss of motor neuron cells in the anterior horn of the spinal cord and subsequent muscle atrophy.

Although they can hardly be distinguished from hereditary motor and sensory neuropathies on the clinical level, dHMNs are considered a separate class of disorders.

Another common system of classification groups many of DHMNs under the heading of spinal muscular atrophies.


Classification 
In 1993, A. E. Hardnig proposed to classify hereditary motor neuropathies into seven groups based on age at onset, mode of inheritance, and presence of additional features. This initial classification has since been widely adopted and expanded and currently looks as follows:

Note: Acronym HMN is also used interchangeably with DHMN.

See also 
 Motor neuron disease
 Hereditary motor and sensory neuropathies
 Spinal muscular atrophies
 Charcot–Marie–Tooth disease
 Hereditary spastic paraplegia

References 

Motor neuron diseases